Robert Herbert (1831–1905) was the first Premier of Queensland, Australia.

Robert Herbert may also refer to:

 Robert Herbert, 12th Earl of Pembroke (1791–1862), British nobleman
 Robert Herbert (cricketer) (1863-1920), Jamaican cricketer
 Bobby Herbert (1925–2006), Scottish footballer
 Bob Herbert (manager) (1942–1999), English artist manager
 Bob Herbert (born 1945), American journalist
 Bob Herbert (footballer) (1919–2004), Australian footballer for Melbourne
 Robert K. Herbert (died 2007), American linguist and anthropologist
 Robert Sawyer Herbert, British Member of Parliament for Wilton
 Robert Herbert (Ontario politician) (1914–1960), Canadian politician